= John Johansson i Brånsta =

Swedish politician

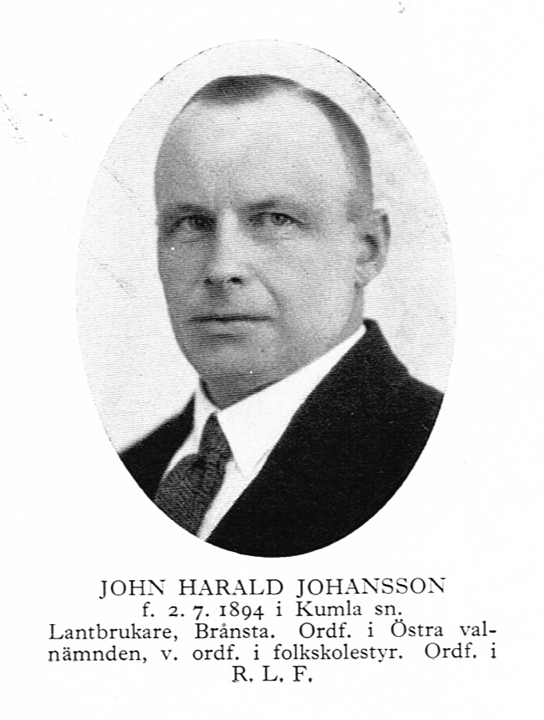

John Johansson i Brånsta (1894–1954) was a Swedish politician. He was a member of the Centre Party.
